The tenth series of The Great British Bake Off began on 27 August 2019. It was presented by returning hosts Noel Fielding and Sandi Toksvig, and judged by returning judges Paul Hollywood and Prue Leith.

The series was won by David Atherton, who became the first winner never to have won the Star Baker title since it was introduced. Alice Fevronia and Steph Blackwell finished as runners-up. This series started with 13 bakers instead of the usual 12, which meant one episode featured a double elimination, as was previously done in the fourth series.

Bakers

Results summary 

Colour key:

Episodes

Episode 1: Cake 
For the signature challenge, the bakers had to bake a fruit cake in the shape of their choice, with a significant amount of dried fruit, and lavish decoration in 2½ hours. For the technical challenge set by Prue, the bakers had to bake six identical angel cake slices, with layers made of genoise sponge sandwiched with Italian meringue buttercream, topped with icing and feathered in 1¾ hour. For the showstopper challenge, the bakers baked the birthday cake they always dreamed of as a child in 4 hours.

Episode 2: Biscuits 
For the signature challenge this week, the bakers were tasked to make 12 decorated chocolate biscuit bars in 2½ hours. For the technical challenge, Paul tasked a "controversial" bake that was his dad's favourite – 12 fig rolls which were identical in shape and size – in 1½ hour. For the showstopper, the bakers were asked to create a 3D biscuit sculpture in 4 hours.

Episode 3: Bread 
For this week's signature challenge, the bakers were asked to make a filled tear & share loaf, from a yeasted dough, in three hours. Paul's technical challenge required the bakers to make eight burger baps, along with four veggie burgers to go inside half of them, in two hours 30 minutes. The showstopper challenge required the bakers to make a display of artistically scored decorative loaves (minimum of two loaves) in five hours.

Episode 4: Dairy 
For the signature challenge this week, Paul and Prue tasked the bakers with a Dairy Cake, but the cake mixture needed to contain a cultured dairy product. For the technical challenge, Prue asked the bakers to make a difficult bake that dated back to the Tudor times, twelve Maids of Honour. For the showstopper challenge, the judges gave the bakers the task of making a display of milk-based Indian sweets known as Mishti.

Episode 5: The Roaring Twenties 
For the signature challenge, the bakers had two and a half hours to produce 4 custard pies which should be elaborately decorated with the theme of the 1920s. For the technical challenge set by Prue, the bakers faced the difficult task of deep-frying Choux pastry to produce 18 Beignet soufflés filled with raspberry jam and served with a zabaglione, in 90 minutes. For the showstopper challenge, the bakers were asked to create a cocktail theme cake, with at least two tiers, in memory of the prohibition era in the United States, in four hours.

Episode 6: Desserts 
For the signature challenge this week, the bakers were asked to make a layered meringue cake with a minimum of three layers and 'large enough to share with friends' in 2 hrs 45 mins. For the technical challenge, Prue gave the bakers a particularly difficult task that tested the bakers' precision, six identical layered Verrines in 2 hrs 30 mins. For the showstopper challenge, the bakers were tasked with an explosive bake, a Celebratory Bombe in 4 hrs 30 mins.

Episode 7: Festivals 
For the signature challenge, the bakers were asked to make 24 buns with the theme of a festival or holiday from around the world. For the technical challenge, Paul tasked the bakers with a deep fried pastry treat traditionally served during the Italian Carnevale, 12 Sicilian Cassatelles. For the showstopper challenge, the bakers were set with the complex task of making a kek lapis Sarawak, a traditional layered Malaysian cake.

Episode 8: Pastry 
For the signature challenge, the bakers were tasked to do a savoury twist on a usually sweet French classic, Tarte Tatin. For the technical challenge, the bakers were given the challenging task of recreating a Moroccan Pie made from warka pastry (also known as brik pastry). For the showstopper challenge, the bakers were asked to create a vertical pie consisting of at least two separate pies.

Episode 9: Pâtisserie (Semi-final) 
For the signature challenge, the bakers had 2 1/2 hours to make eight identically decorated domed tarts. Prue's technical challenge was making a Gâteau Saint Honoré, a French classic involving both choux and puff pastry, plus a large amount of cream fillings, all in 3 1/2 hours. For the showstopper challenge, the bakers were given the difficult task of making a sugar glass display case, enclosing a display of pâtisserie or other lavish baked goods, in 4 1/2 hours.

Episode 10: Final 
For the final signature challenge, the remaining three bakers were given 2 hours to create the ultimate chocolate cake, that should be rich in chocolate and be beautifully decorated. For the final technical challenge, set by Paul, the bakers were given 1 hour 10 minutes to create six twice-baked Stilton Soufflés, each served with a lavash cracker. For the final showstopper challenge, the bakers were required to create a deceptive illusion picnic basket feast composed of cakes, biscuits and enriched breads that were presented to look like something else, in 4 1/2 hours.

Specials 
Two festive specials were commissioned during Christmas Day and New Year’s Day.

The Great Christmas Bake Off 
The Great Christmas Bake Off featured Briony Williams and Terry Hartill from Series 9, along with Tom Hetherington and Yan Tsou from Series 8. The special was won by Briony Williams.

The returning bakers were first asked to make 24 festive cake pops in the signature challenge. They then faced the technical challenge set by Paul, where they had to recreate a festive sausage roll wreath. For the festive showstopper challenge, the bakers were given the task of constructing a 3D gingerbread building, topped off with at least two different types of confectionery.

The Great Festive Bake Off 
The Great Festive Bake Off saw the cast of Derry Girls (Saoirse-Monica Jackson, Nicola Coughlan, Jamie-Lee O’Donnell, Dylan Llewellyn and Siobhan McSweeney) take on the three challenges on New Years Day.

Post-show careers 
David Atherton published a cookbook after winning the series. Released in 2020, it is a children's cookbook titled My First Cookbook.  Follow-up versions My First Green Cookbook and Bake, Make and Learn to Cook released in 2021. In May 2021, Atherton released Good to Eat, which focuses on delivering healthy twists to classic recipes. 

Steph Blackwell contributed to The Big Book of Amazing Cakes, and published her own cookbook, The Joy of Baking, in 2021.

Ratings
The first episode drew an overnight audience of 5.7 million, down 400,000 from the previous series, but with a higher audience share in its time slot than the previous launch at 30.6%.  The overnight ratings for the final episode dropped by over half a million compared to the previous series with an average audience of 6.9 million viewers.

References 

Series 10
2019 British television seasons